Intermediate Women's College or Women's College, Hajipur is a private College offering Intermediate education for girls affiliated to BSEB is in Hajipur, Vaishali district, Bihar, India.

Department and courses

Science
Physics
Chemistry
Mathematics or
Biology
 Hindi
 English

Arts and Literature
Geography
History
Civics
Hindi
English
Korean

Affiliations

The courses offered by the institution is permanently approved from BSEB, Patna, the Government of Bihar and Department of HRD and Education.

MoU
College has signed several MoU with other institutions, companies, NGOs to promote crosscultural activities in the campus. Recently the college signed MoU with Korean Culture Institute, Patna, to teach KorEan. 

Infrastructure
The college has its campus in the heart of the city near the office of the District Collector. Recently, the college renovated its old building Sarswati Bhawan and a new open air auditorium was built for cultural performances.

References

Universities and colleges in Bihar
Education in Hajipur
Educational institutions established in 1985
1985 establishments in Bihar